Kvasstinden is the highest mountain on the island of Andøya in the Vesterålen archipelago in northern Norway. It is located in the southern part of Andøy Municipality in Nordland county.

References

Mountains of Nordland
Andøy